Disciples (stylised as DISCIPLΞS) are a British production trio made up of Nathan Vincent Duvall, Gavin Koolmon, and Luke McDermott based in South London.

Career

2013–14: Early career
Disciples released their debut EP Remedy in 2013 on New State Music. It was picked up by DJ Target who introduced it to the mainstream on his 100% HomeGrown show on BBC Radio 1Xtra, a BBC radio channel. They also released the track "Catwalk" picked by Pete Tong, a British DJ on BBC and record label owner FFRR Records. Disciples's first major hit was "They Don't Know", released once again on FFRR Records in February 2015. BBC Radio 1 picked it as its "Track of the Day" and Tong highlighted it in his BBC Radio 1 programme Essential Mix.

2015–present
The trio gained international recognition through their collaboration with Scottish record producer Calvin Harris on "How Deep Is Your Love", which peaked at No. 2 on the UK Singles Chart and No. 27 on the US Billboard Hot 100. The group released their EP The Following through FFRR Records on 24 October 2015. "How Deep Is Your Love" was nominated for British Artist Video of the Year and British Single at the 2016 Brit Awards. Later in the year, on 12 August, the trio released 'Daylight' which became Annie Mac's  Hottest Record In The World. The song was added to Pete Tong's Essential Tune playlist and Danny Howard's Dance Anthems.

On 17 February 2017, Disciples released "On My Mind" which peaked at No. 15 in the UK Singles chart. The track went gold and stayed in the charts for a total of 22 weeks. It also featured as Radio 1's Hottest Record In The World and Tune Of The Week. Later on that year, on 29 September, Disciples released the track "Jealousy" which gained radio success and became Radio 1's Tune Of The Week.

Discography

Extended plays

Singles

Other appearances

Remixes
2019: Ella Eyre — "Mama" (Disciples Remix)

Songwriting and Production Credits

References

External links 
 

English record producers
Parlophone artists
English house music groups
British musical trios
Musical groups from London